Ja samo pjevam is the seventh album by Croatian singer Severina. It was released in 1999 by Croatia Records, and sold more than 50,000 copies. In addition to nine original songs, the album also includes a cover of the song "Dodirni mi koljena". Four singles from the album "Da si moj", "Ante", "Ja samo pjevam" and "Dodirni mi kolenje" were released. The album was not supported by an indoor tour, but on July 6, 2000, she held a solo concert at the Stari plac stadium in Split in front of more than 20,000 people.

Track listing
"Ante"
"Ja samo pjevam" (I Just Sing)
"Dodirni mi koljena" (Touch My Knees)
"Nedostaješ mi" (I Miss You)
"Tužna pjesma" (Sad Song)
"Da si moj" (If You Were Mine)
"Bolna ti bolujem" (Painfully Suffering)
"Esmeralda"
"Daj da biram" (Let Me Choose)
"Odavde do vječnosti" (From Here to Eternity)

References

External links

1999 albums
Severina (singer) albums